Sandy McCarthy (born June 15, 1972) is a Canadian former professional ice hockey right winger who played 11 seasons in the National Hockey League (NHL) with the Calgary Flames, Tampa Bay Lightning, Philadelphia Flyers, Carolina Hurricanes, New York Rangers and Boston Bruins.

Playing career

McCarthy grew up playing minor hockey in the Barrie Minor Hockey Association with the Flyers rep program.  He played Jr.C. hockey at age 15 with the Midland Centennials before elevating to the Hawkesbury Hawks Jr.A. club of the Central Junior Hockey League.

In May of 1989, McCarthy was selected by the Niagara Falls Thunder in the 11th round (163rd overall) of the OHL Priority Selection.  After not being signed by the Thunder, McCarthy's rights were waived to the QMJHL Laval Titan where he starred for 3 years - including a trip to the Memorial Cup in Hamilton in 1990.

Sandy McCarthy was selected by the Calgary Flames in the third round (52nd overall) of the 1991 NHL Entry Draft. He began playing hockey in the Georgian Bay Junior C Hockey League with the Midland Centennials and the Central Junior A Hockey League for the Hawkesbury Hawks. As a power forward, McCarthy played for the QMJHL Laval Titan in the 1989–90 season before being drafted by the Calgary Flames. He played one last season with the Titan. His next stop was during the 1992–93 season for the IHL's Salt Lake Golden Eagles. Sandy throughout his career with the Flames played the role as the enforcer, with many major fights.

While playing in the NHL, Sandy McCarthy became well known for incidents surrounding racial slurs. In the year 1998, McCarthy was accused of racial insensitivity in the form of gestures against African-American player Peter Worrell. Along with teammate Darcy Tucker, allegations were denied and the victim, Worrell, also confirmed he had not seen or heard any racial insults made towards him from either of the Tampa Bay players. McCarthy stated that growing up half aboriginal and half black, he would "never go there" because he had to go through racial taunts growing up. This incident occurred during a game against the Florida Panthers while McCarthy was with Tampa Bay Lightning in 1998.

The following season in 1999, McCarthy was playing for the Philadelphia Flyers when he stated that Toronto Maple Leafs player Tie Domi made racial slurs towards him. Domi insisted this was a false accusation against him and went on to say he had no respect for McCarthy and would never partake in a fight with him. An NHL investigation was also conducted that reinforced Domi's denial.

As his time in the NHL progressed, he switched from his role as a power forward in junior hockey to more of a pressure player, offensively as well as defensively.

McCarthy would remain in Calgary for the next five years before being traded, in 1998, to the Tampa Bay Lightning, for a short stay. His next stop was with the Philadelphia Flyers for the next two seasons then a brief stint for the Carolina Hurricanes. McCarthy would then move on to the New York Rangers in August 2000 where he would score a career season high 11 goals. The next season, he would score a career high in points with 23. 

One of his more infamous fights happened while a member of the New York Rangers. In a game on November 8, 2001, against the New York Islanders, McCarthy challenged defenceman Eric Cairns to a fight which Cairns refused. Later in the shift, McCarthy scored and as McCarthy celebrated, Cairns gave him a jab to the jaw, which led to a fight between Cairns and Steve McKenna.  While Cairns was in the penalty box, he was  called chicken by Theoren Fleury who flapped his arms like a chicken to suggest that Cairns was afraid to fight McCarthy, who flexed his biceps and looked at Cairns. The next time the two teams played against each other on December 21, 2001 Cairns fought McCarthy and beat him.

McCarthy signed with the Boston Bruins during the summer of 2003 then was claimed off waivers at the 2004 trade deadline by the Rangers.

In 2012, McCarthy was inducted into the Barrie Sports Hall of Fame in Barrie, Ontario.

In his 735 games, 15 season NHL career, McCarthy recorded 72 goals, 76 assists and 1554 penalty minutes. In his 11 seasons in the NHL he made just over 7 million dollars, increasing his yearly amount each year he played.

Coaching career 
After 15 seasons in the NHL, McCarthy changed his focus from professional hockey to becoming an assistant head coach with the Woodstock Slammers, a Junior A team in New Brunswick. Andrew McCain, President of the Junior A team stated McCarthy was a "motivator who had strong beliefs in detection and discipline" which would help the team reach their goal of making it to the Royal Bank cup. Since 2015, Sandy has remained a part of the coaching staff of the team and has become the head coach.

Personal life
McCarthy's father is Black, while his mother is a white woman from Newfoundland. He claims that his mother also has Mi'kmaq ancestry.

Born in Toronto, McCarthy moved to Barrie, Ontario as a young boy and lived across the street from the rink in Allandale. He now lives in Woodstock, New Brunswick and is the associate coach of the Campbellton Tigers of the Maritime Hockey League.

Career statistics

Transactions
March 24, 1998 – Traded by the Calgary Flames, along with Calgary's 1998 3rd and 5th round draft choices, to the Tampa Bay Lightning in exchange for Jason Wiemer.
March 20, 1999 – Traded by the Tampa Bay Lightning, along with Mikael Andersson, to the Philadelphia Flyers in exchange for Colin Forbes and Philadelphia's 1999 4th round draft choice.
March 14, 2000 – Traded by the Philadelphia Flyers to the Carolina Hurricanes in exchange for Kent Manderville.
August 4, 2000 – Traded by the Carolina Hurricanes, along with Carolina's 2001 4th round draft choice, to the New York Rangers in exchange for Darren Langdon and Rob DiMaio.
August 12, 2003 – Signed as a free agent with the Boston Bruins.
March 9, 2004 – Claimed off waivers by the New York Rangers from the Boston Bruins.

References

External links
 

1972 births
Black Canadian ice hockey players
Boston Bruins players
Canadian expatriate ice hockey players in the United States
Canadian ice hockey right wingers
Calgary Flames draft picks
Calgary Flames players
Carolina Hurricanes players
Ice hockey people from Simcoe County
Laval Titan players
Living people
New York Rangers players
Philadelphia Flyers players
Salt Lake Golden Eagles (IHL) players
Sportspeople from Barrie
Ice hockey people from Toronto
Tampa Bay Lightning players